Pichayevo is the name of several rural localities in Tambov Oblast, Russia:
Pichayevo, Pichayevsky District, Tambov Oblast, a selo in Pichayevsky Selsoviet of Pichayevsky District
Pichayevo, Zherdevsky District, Tambov Oblast, a selo in Pichayevsky Selsoviet of Zherdevsky District